Jade Thomas (born 10 December 1982) is a Welsh female football player for Liverpool Ladies and the Welsh Women's National team. She has won the Women's Premier League and also been relegated with Liverpool. She joined LFC Ladies in 2000 and plays as a winger or forward.

Jade was born in St Asaph, the daughter of former Everton player Mickey Thomas and supports Everton despite ironically playing for their Merseyside rivals. Her mother was a former Miss Wales.

Jade also appeared on popular sports show Soccer AM in the early stages on the 2006-07 Season as a Soccerette

External links

LFC profile
Bluekipper article (scroll down to the bottom)

1982 births
Living people
Sportspeople from St Asaph
Welsh women's footballers
Wales women's international footballers
Liverpool F.C. Women players
FA Women's National League players
Expatriate women's footballers in England
Women's association football wingers
Women's association football forwards